Valdr Galga may refer to:
Valdr Galga (Ruler of the Gallows), a name for Odin
Valdr Galga, a 1999 album by Thyrfing, a Viking metal band from Sweden